Old Buckenham Hall is a cricket ground in Old Buckenham, near Attleborough, Norfolk.

History
The estate at Old Buckenham Hall was purchased by the Australian financier Lionel Robinson in 1906 from Frederick Duleep Singh. Robinson expanded the estate from 340 to 2000 acres and within the space of four years built two separate cricket grounds, each equipped with a thatched timber pavilion. The first ground was half a mile from the Hall and adjacent to Old Buckenham Stud, which Robinson established to further his involvement in horse racing. The second – the current ground – was created in a woodland clearing close to the rebuilt Hall, Robinson having replaced Duleep Singh’s Georgian house with a vast neo-Jacobean mansion. 

His personal cricket team played the first of several first-class cricket matches at the ground against the touring South Africans in 1912. Before the First World War, three further first-class matches were held there with L. G. Robinson's XI playing Cambridge University and J. R. Mason's XI in 1913, and Oxford University in 1914. In 1919, Robinson hosted the Australian Imperial Forces, a team formed of Australian servicemen who were facing a prolonged delay to their demobilisation. The AIF team had been selected from around 100 Australian servicemen who had turned up for trials at Lord's and The Oval; curiously for a first-class fixture, the match was twelve-a-side. 

In early May 1921, a final first-class match was held at the ground between L. G. Robinson's XI and the touring Australians. Robinson’s team was captained by his cricket manager, the former England captain Archie MacLaren, and included Jack Hobbs, Percy Chapman and Johnny Douglas.  Australia were led by Warwick Armstrong and included Jack Gregory – who had made his first-class debut with the AIF team at Old Buckenham two years previously –  Warren Bardsley and Charlie Macartney. The three-day match was rain-affected and ended in a draw. Hobbs top-scored with 85, an effort he later nominated as possibly his finest ever innings. A crowd of up to 10,000 watched Hobbs bat on the second day, believed to be the largest ever to attend a cricket match in Norfolk.

School Years and Fire
Following Lionel Robinson’s death in July 1922, the Hall and estate were sold and came into the possession of Ernest Gates who continued to stage cricket at the ground until putting the property up for sale in 1932. Four years later, Old Buckenham Hall School was established there and the cricket ground formed part of the school’s sporting facilities. The Hall, however, was destroyed by fire in December 1952, only an annexed building (now a private residence still bearing the name Old Buckenham Hall) surviving the blaze. The school moved to alternative premises, eventually becoming established at Brettenham, although retaining the name Old Buckenham Hall School. The thatched cricket pavilion at Old Buckenham was also dismantled and moved to the school’s playing fields at Brettenham where it still stands.

Reclaim and Restoration
After the school’s departure, the Old Buckenham Hall cricket ground fell into disuse until it was restored in the early 1960s by members of Old Buckenham Cricket Club at the invitation of the then landowners, Oliver and Greeba Sear Prior to that, the club had played on the village green. In 1982 the club bought the ground and six years later erected a brick pavilion and scorers’ box. The ground remains the home of Old Buckenham Cricket Club. It is now named The Horry Panks Cricket Ground in honour of a long-serving player and groundsman whose family was instrumental in its 1960s revival.

Records

First-class
Highest team total: 362 for 8 declared by L. G. Robinson's XI v Australian Imperial Forces, 1919
Lowest team total: 66 all out by South Africans v L. G. Robinson's XI, 1912
Highest individual innings: 111 by Sir Tim O'Brien for L. G. Robinson's XI v Oxford University, 1914
Best bowling in an innings: 7-88 by Sydney Barnes for L. G. Robinson's XI v J. R. Mason's XI, 1913
Best bowling in a match: 11-120 by Sid Pegler for South Africans v L. G. Robinson's XI, 1912

References

External links
Old Buckenham Hall at ESPNcricinfo

Cricket grounds in Norfolk
Sports venues completed in 1912
1912 establishments in England